Red Nose Day Actually is a 2017 British romantic comedy television short promotional film, following a dozen of the characters from Richard Curtis' Christmas film Love Actually, as part of the fundraising event Red Nose Day 2017. Curtis returns with many of the film's cast members including Hugh Grant, Liam Neeson, Colin Firth, Andrew Lincoln, Chiwetel Ejiofor, Keira Knightley, Martine McCutcheon, Bill Nighy, Thomas Sangster, Lúcia Moniz, Olivia Olson, Marcus Brigstocke, and Rowan Atkinson.

The short film was first broadcast on BBC One on 24 March 2017 as a part of Red Nose Day.

A slightly different version of the film, featuring Laura Linney reprising her role and Patrick Dempsey, was broadcast in the US on 25 May 2017.

Plot 
The film is set in March 2017, 13 years after the events of the original film.

Juliet is watching television with her husband Peter. When the doorbell rings and she opens the door, Juliet finds Mark, who, similarly to 13 years ago, communicates with her by using cue cards, having her pretend to Peter, this time, that Mark is a fund raiser for Red Nose Day. They tell each other that they are very happy with their respective lives, and Mark presents his new wife, who is none other than British supermodel Kate Moss, whom, 13 years prior, he jokingly said he was going to marry. Mark's final card proposes that they see what happened to the rest of their friends.

David, who has lost and recently regained his position as Prime Minister since the first film, dances in his official residence once again, even continuing in great pain after falling down the stairs. His wife and former employee Natalie amicably reprimands him, and offers to make him tea. Later in a public speech, he states that although times are harder for a lot of people now, he still believes that love and the good in people will win in the end.

Billy Mack recently released a charity single, a cover of the 1983 ZZ Top song "Gimme All Your Lovin'". As the reporter interviewing him on radio tries to help him raise awareness for Red Nose Day, Billy openly admits to not caring about children (except for the ones that buy his discs) and that he only promotes the charity to, in truth, get free publicity for his upcoming autobiography, which he has admittedly neither written nor read. He then reveals with sadness that his manager Joe has died from a heart attack since the first film, before stating that the greatest sex he ever had was with one of the Kardashians, although he cannot decide which one.

Among salesman Rufus's products are red noses in honour of Red Nose Day. When a child in line buys one and agrees to have it gift wrapped, Rufus proceeds with great delight to take an absurdly excessive amount of time doing so. The waiting line soon becomes so long that it blocks car traffic outside.

Meanwhile, on their way to pick up their three children from school, Jamie and his wife Aurélia recall their first days together. Aurélia says in Portuguese that even though life makes it impossible to be completely happy, love sometimes makes you feel like you are. She then reveals to Jamie that she is pregnant with their fourth child, though he misunderstands her and believes she was telling him what was for dinner.

Sitting on a bench, Daniel receives a surprise visit from his stepson Sam, who is now 26 and lives in New York City. When Daniel expresses concern because Sam had not been in touch, he is surprised to see Joanna, Sam's childhood crush 13 years ago who had left for America. She asks for Sam's hand in marriage, and Daniel, delighted, jokingly answers that he will think about it.

The film then ends with footage showing various people and actions supported by Comic Relief, and some of the film's cast wearing red noses.

Cast 
 Hugh Grant as David
 Liam Neeson as Daniel
 Colin Firth as Jamie
 Andrew Lincoln as Mark
 Chiwetel Ejiofor as Peter
 Keira Knightley as Juliet
 Martine McCutcheon as Natalie
 Bill Nighy as Billy Mack
 Thomas Sangster as Sam
 Lúcia Moniz as Aurélia
 Olivia Olson as Joanna
 Marcus Brigstocke as Mikey
 Rowan Atkinson as Rufus
 Kate Moss as herself
 Victoria Derbyshire as Journalist
 Charlie Stayt as Reporter
 Jo Whiley as herself (voice)
 Laura Linney as Sarah (US release)
 Patrick Dempsey as Sarah’s husband (US release)

Production 

Shooting began in February 2017, with the film being announced at the same time. The film was broadcast on BBC One as part of Red Nose Day on 24 March 2017. Among the returning cast are Hugh Grant, Keira Knightley, Colin Firth, Liam Neeson, Bill Nighy, Andrew Lincoln, Thomas Sangster, Chiwetel Ejiofor, Marcus Brigstocke and Rowan Atkinson were all confirmed to return. Actors who did not return included Emma Thompson, Martin Freeman, Joanna Page, Rodrigo Santoro, and Gregor Fisher. Emma Thompson chose not to do the sequel due to the recent passing of screen husband Alan Rickman.

US version 
An additional sequence with Laura Linney and Patrick Dempsey was shot after the UK airing, for the US broadcast on NBC on 25 May 2017. It features Linney's character, Sarah, answering her cell phone as if it were her brother calling as in the film, only to reveal the caller is Patrick Dempsey, who remarks that he loves the way she always answers her phone and that she is a wonderful wife, thus giving her character a decidedly happy ending.

The US version also includes alternate versions of the two Rowan Atkinson scenes, set in the US. There are alternate exterior shots of the store he works in, which is now a Walgreens in Midtown Manhattan, replacing the unnamed suburban British store in the original. The US version has Walgreens signage and Red Nose Day banners with the US date, two months later than in the UK, behind Atkinson throughout his scenes. The young actor playing Atkinson's customer speaks slightly different dialogue, with an American accent this time, and Atkinson describes costs in dollars instead of pounds.

The US version also replaces The Beach Boys' 1966 song "God Only Knows" over the opening shots with a cue from Craig Armstrong's score for the original film.

References

External links 
 
 Full US version at Vimeo

2017 television films
2017 films
2017 romantic comedy-drama films
2017 short films
BBC Film films
British romantic comedy-drama films
British comedy short films
Films directed by Richard Curtis
Films directed by Mat Whitecross
Films set in London
Films shot in London
Films with screenplays by Richard Curtis
Red Nose Day
Romantic comedy short films
Portuguese-language films
2010s English-language films
2010s British films